The Ramea Islands, Newfoundland and Labrador, are an archipel of the south coast of Newfoundland. In 1864 there was a small community of 30 families. The Ramea Islands are a group that contains five large islands, namely Northwest Island, Great Island (or Big Island), Middle Island, Harbour Island and Southwest Island. In the early 1940s, all inhabitants moved to Northwest Island and formed the present town of Ramea.

See also
List of communities in Newfoundland and Labrador

References

Populated coastal places in Canada
Populated places in Newfoundland and Labrador